The Americas Zone is one of the three zones of regional Davis Cup competition in 2012.

In the Americas Zone there are three different groups in which teams compete against each other to advance to the next group.

Participating nations

Seeds:

Remaining nations:

Draw

 and  relegated to Group III in 2013.
 promoted to Group I in 2013.

First round

Paraguay vs. Barbados

Mexico vs. El Salvador

Bolivia vs. Dominican Republic

Puerto Rico vs. Venezuela

Second round

Mexico vs. Barbados

Dominican Republic vs. Venezuela

Play-offs

Paraguay vs. El Salvador

Bolivia vs. Puerto Rico

Third round

Mexico vs. Dominican Republic

References

External links
Official website

Americas Zone Group II
Davis Cup Americas Zone